Cope is a surname, and may refer to

 Sir Anthony Cope (c. 1486–1551)
 Arthur C. Cope, American chemist
 Bob Cope, American football coach
 Charles West Cope (1811–1890), English artist
 Cuthbert Leslie Cope (1903–1975), English physician
 Davey Cope (1877–1898), South African rugby union player
 David Cope, artificial intelligence and music researcher
 David Cope (economist), British energy & resource economist
 Derrike Cope, American racing driver
 Edward Drinker Cope, American anatomist and paleontologist
 Edward Meredith Cope, English classical scholar
 Frederick Cope, Canadian politician
 Geoff Cope, English cricketer
 George Cope (tobacco manufacturer), English industrialist
 Gilbert Cope (1840–1928), American historian and genealogist
 Harold Cope (1902–1980), English footballer
 Jack Cope, South African writer
 James Cope (UK politician), British MP and Resident to the Hanseatic League in the mid-eighteenth century
 Jamie Cope, English snooker player
 Jean-François Copé, French politician 
 Jim Cope (1911–1999), Australian politician
 John Cope (British Army officer), English general during the 1745 Jacobite Uprising 
 John Cope, Baron Cope of Berkeley, English politician
 Julian Cope, English musician
 Kenneth Cope, English actor
 Kenneth Cope (musician), American composer
 Kit Cope, American martial arts fighter
 Marianne Cope, American nun and Catholic saint
 Mike Cope, American racing driver
 Myron Cope, American radio personality
 Peter Cope, American test pilot
 Richard Cope (1776–1856), English congregationalist minister and religious writer
 Sidney Cope (1904–1986), English cricketer
 Thomas Cope (1827–1884), English tobacco manufacturer
 Tom Cope, English footballer
 Thomas D. Cope, American historian and physicist
 Warner Cope, American judge
 Wendy Cope, English poet
 Zachary Cope, English physician and surgeon

Cope family
The Cope family of Loughgall, County Armagh is a historic family in British politics.

Members 

 Robert Cope
 Robert Camden Cope
 Anthony Cope

See also
 Cope (disambiguation)
 Cape (surname)

English-language surnames